Denver Earl "Denny" Butler Jr. (born 1970) is an American politician and a former Republican member of the Kentucky House of Representatives. Butler represented District 38 from January 8, 2013, to January 3, 2017.

Education
Butler attended Jefferson Community College (now Jefferson Community and Technical College), and earned his BA and BS in justice administration from the University of Louisville. His father, Denver Butler Sr. served in the House of Representatives for District 38 from 1989 to 2007.

Elections

 2016 Butler was unopposed in the Republican Primary and lost to Democratic nominee McKenzie Cantrell 7,600 votes (50.87%) to 7,341 votes (49.13%).

On November 19, 2015, Butler announced he was switching parties and filing for re-election as a Republican.

 2014 Butler was unopposed in the Democratic Primary and the General Election.

2012 To challenge District 38 incumbent Republican Representative Mike Nemes, Butler was unopposed for the May 22, 2012, Democratic Primary and won the November 6, 2012, General election, with 7,893 votes (59.2%) against Representative Nemes.

References

External links
Official page at the Kentucky General Assembly
Campaign site

Denver "Denny" Butler at Ballotpedia
Denver Butler at the National Institute on Money in State Politics

Place of birth missing (living people)
Living people
American police officers
Kentucky Democrats
Members of the Kentucky House of Representatives
Politicians from Louisville, Kentucky
University of Louisville alumni
Kentucky Republicans
21st-century American politicians
1970 births